Armenia participated in the Junior Eurovision Song Contest 2017 which took place on 26 November 2017 in Tbilisi, Georgia. The Armenian broadcaster Armenian Public Television (ARMTV) was responsible for organising their entry for the contest. Michael Grigoryan, also known as Misha, was internally selected on 18 July 2017 as the Armenian representative. His song for the contest, "Boomerang", was revealed on 23 October 2017.

Background

Prior to the 2016 contest, Armenia had participated in the Junior Eurovision Song Contest nine times since its first entry in 2007, with their best result being in  when they won with the song "Mama", performed by Vladimir Arzumanyan. Armenia went on to host the Junior Eurovision Song Contest 2011 in the Armenian capital Yerevan.

Before Junior Eurovision
The Armenian broadcaster announced on 18 July 2017 that the Armenian entrant for the Junior Eurovision Song Contest 2017 was Michael Grigoryan. His entry for the contest in Georgia, "Boomerang", was presented to the public along with its official music video on 23 October 2017.

Artist and song information

Misha
Michael Grigoryan (born 4 May 2008 in Republic of Artsakh) is an Armenian child singer. His mother is a music teacher at a local kindergarten and his father is the conductor of NKR's Army Orchestra.

He studies at Stepanakert's N3 school and started his musical career at the early age of 4 years old. Then he met Lira Kocharyan, founder and director of the music group "Voices of Artsakh", who would eventually become his producer, and Misha started being a part of the group, working with music professionals.

Soon after he began participating in international competitions and winning several awards. In 2016, he took part in the children's version of New Wave with his song "Poqrik Karabakhtsi", getting a second place and being the jury's favorite.

Boomerang

"Boomerang" is a song by Armenian child singer Michael Grigoyan. It represented Armenia at the Junior Eurovision Song Contest 2017, and placed 6th.

At Junior Eurovision
During the opening ceremony and the running order draw which both took place on 20 November 2017, Armenia was drawn to perform fourth on 26 November 2017, following the Netherlands and preceding Belarus.

Voting

Detailed voting results

References

Junior Eurovision Song Contest
Armenia
2017